Radhray Solomon (born 14 November 1954) is a Guyanese cricketer. He played in two first-class matches for Guyana in 1973/74.

See also
 List of Guyanese representative cricketers

References

External links
 

1954 births
Living people
Guyanese cricketers
Guyana cricketers